Akhter Husain, HPk, OBE, (1 August 1902 – 15 July 1983) was a senior statesman and civil servant of Pakistan. He was appointed Governor of West Pakistan in September 1957 succeeding Mushtaq Ahmed Gurmani and then continued in this office during the regime of General Muhammad Ayub Khan until April 1960.

Early life

Akhter Husain was born on 1 August 1902 at Burhanpur (Central Province India) and received his early education from Hakimia High School, Burhanpur before proceeding to MAO College at Aligarh (which later became Aligarh Muslim University), graduating later from Allahbad University. He was selected for the Indian Civil Service in 1924 and completed his education and training at St. John's College, Cambridge, England. Upon return from England, he was posted to serve in the province of Punjab in 1926. He served in various administrative positions in different districts of the province, before being appointed as Under Secretary in the Government of India in 1930. He returned to Provincial administration in 1936. Akhter  Husain received a British government award of Order of the British Empire (OBE) on 1 January 1944 for his groundbreaking work of settlement in the district of Gurgaon in Punjab in 1943. He was appointed Chief Secretary in the undivided Punjab in 1946, a position he occupied during the partition of British India.

Pakistan Government Service

He continued to serve as the Chief Secretary of West Punjab in the newly formed Dominion of Pakistan in 1947.

Governor

Akhter Husain was appointed Governor on 28 August 1957 and remained in this position following the imposition of Martial law in Oct 1958. In the same year he was appointed Chairman of the Land Reforms Commission and provincial administration committee. In 1958, he was awarded the highest civil award of Hilal-i-Pakistan. He was responsible for raising money for the construction of the Pakistan Day Memorial Monument (now known as Minar-e-Pakistan) and laid its foundation stone in the then Minto Park Lahore on 23 March 1960.

Later years

In 1960 after his governorship, he was appointed as minister in the Presidential cabinet successively holding the portfolios of Information and Broadcasting and then Education and Kashmir Affairs. In order to hold these quasi-political positions, he retired from the Civil Service. He was also the recipient of the honorary degree of Doctor of Law from the University of the Punjab.
He was subsequently appointed Chief Election Commissioner of Pakistan and served in that position between 1962 and 1964. He also held the office of President of Anjuman-i Taraqqi-i Urdu (The organisation for the promotion and development of the Urdu language) from 1962 to 1983 and was Chairman of Pakistan Burmah Shell from 1968 until his death in 1983.

References

1902 births
1983 deaths
Indian Civil Service (British India) officers
Governors of West Pakistan
Pakistani civil servants
Defence Secretaries of Pakistan
Officers of the Order of the British Empire
Aligarh Muslim University alumni
People from Burhanpur
Muhajir people
Alumni of St John's College, Cambridge